Tratar de Estar Mejor is the second studio album by Argentine singer-songwriter Diego Torres, it was released on November 22, 1994 through RCA Records.

Track listing

1) Tratar de estar mejor. (Torres/López)

2) Todo cambia (y todo se termina). (Torres/López)

3) Dame una razón. (Torres/López)

4) Aunque quieras. (Torres/López)

5) Deja de pedir perdón. (Torres/López)

6) Te pido que vuelvas. (Torres/López)

7) Pensar (que siempre hay alguien más). (Torres/López)

8) San Salvador. (Torres/López/Tomas)

9) Secretos del mar. (Torres/López)

10) Por la vereda del sol. (Rew)

Chart performance

Costarican weekly number 1 singles

Certifications and sales

References

1994 albums
Diego Torres albums
Spanish-language albums
Albums produced by Cachorro López